William Bryant, Jr.  (born January 15, 1951) is a former American football cornerback in the National Football League (NFL) for the New York Giants and the Philadelphia Eagles.

Career
Bryant played college football at Grambling State University and was drafted in the sixth round of the 1974 NFL Draft by the Cincinnati Bengals.  Bryant was also drafted by the Houston Texans in the thirty-third round of the 1974 World Football League college draft. He signed with the Texans and began the 1974 season with them before switching to the Birmingham Americans midway through the season when the Texans encountered financial difficulties. He played for the Birmingham Vulcans in the WFL's ill-fated 1975 season until the league folded on October 22, 1975.

References

1951 births
Living people
American football cornerbacks
Birmingham Americans players
Birmingham Vulcans players
Cincinnati Bengals players
Grambling State Tigers football players
Philadelphia Eagles players
New York Giants players
Players of American football from Shreveport, Louisiana
American football players with chronic traumatic encephalopathy